Elvis Yamilet Lovera Espinoza (born 13 August 1986), also known as Yamilet Lovera, is a Venezuelan footballer who plays as a defender. She has been a member of the Venezuela women's national team.

Early life
Lovera was raised in San Juan de los Morros, Guárico.

Club career
Lovera has played for Flor de Patria FC and Caracas FC in Venezuela.

International career
Lovera represented Venezuela at the 2006 South American U-20 Women's Championship. She capped at senior level during the 2006 South American Women's Football Championship.

International goals 
Scores and results list Venezuela's goal tally first

References

1986 births
Living people
People from Guárico
Venezuelan women's footballers
Women's association football defenders
Caracas FC players
Venezuela women's international footballers